In astronomy, Bok globules are isolated and relatively small dark nebulae, containing dense cosmic dust and gas from which star formation may take place. Bok globules are found within H II regions, and typically have a mass of about 2 to 50 solar masses contained within a region about a light year or so across (about ). They contain molecular hydrogen (H2), carbon oxides and helium, and around 1% (by mass) silicate dust. Bok globules most commonly result in the formation of double- or multiple-star systems.

History 
Bok globules were first observed by astronomer Bart Bok in the 1940s. In an article published in 1947, he and Edith Reilly hypothesized that these clouds were "similar to insect's cocoons" that were undergoing gravitational collapse to form new stars, from which stars and star clusters were born. 
This hypothesis was difficult to verify due to the observational difficulties of establishing what was happening inside a dense dark cloud that obscured all visible light emitted from within it.  An analysis of near-infrared observations published in 1990 confirmed that stars were being born inside Bok globules. Further observations have revealed that some Bok globules contain embedded warm sources, some contain Herbig–Haro objects, and some show outflows of molecular gas.  Millimeter-wave emission line studies have provided evidence for the infall of material onto an accreting protostar.
It is now thought that a typical Bok globule contains about 10 solar masses of material in a region about a light-year or so across, and that Bok globules most commonly result in the formation of double- or multiple-star systems.

Bok globules are still a subject of intense research. Known to be some of the coldest objects in the natural universe, their structure and density remains somewhat a mystery. Methods applied so far have relied on column density derived from near-infrared extinction and even star counting in a bid to probe these objects further.

Bok globules that are irradiated by ultraviolet light from hot nearby stars exhibit stripping of materials to produce a tail. These types are called "cometary globules" (CG).

Image gallery

See also 
 Molecular cloud
 Barnard 68
 CG 4
 NGC 281
 IC 2944

References

External links 

 A Star in the Making

Bok globule
1940s in science